Luís Enrique Peñalver Pereira (born 10 February 1996) is a Spanish badminton player. The Toledo-born, represented Spain competed at the 2014 Summer Youth Olympics in Nanjing, China. He was a part of the Spanish national junior team that won the gold medal at the 2015 European Junior Championships in the mixed team event. In 2017, he won his first senior title at the Romanian International tournament in the men's singles event.

Achievements

Mediterranean Games 
Men's singles

Men's doubles

BWF International Challenge/Series (5 titles, 3 runners-up) 
Men's singles

  BWF International Challenge tournament
  BWF International Series tournament
  BWF Future Series tournament

References

External links 
 

1996 births
Living people
Sportspeople from Toledo, Spain
Spanish male badminton players
Badminton players at the 2014 Summer Youth Olympics
Competitors at the 2022 Mediterranean Games
Mediterranean Games silver medalists for Spain
Mediterranean Games medalists in badminton